Suli or Sulli can refer to:

 Souli, region in Epirus, Greece, and home of the Souliotes
 Abu Bakr bin Yahya al-Suli (c. 880 – 946), poet and scholar at the Abbasid court
 Suliformes, proposed order of seabirds
 Suli Lake in China
 Suli (1978 film), 1978 Indian film
 Suli (2016 film), 2016 Indian film
 János Süli (born 1956), Hungarian engineer, businessman and politician
 Moses Suli, rugby league footballer
 The Suli, a fictional nomadic group from Leigh Bardugo's Grishaverse novels.

See also
Sulli (disambiguation)